Unjalur is a panchayat town situated in Erode district in the Indian state of Tamil Nadu.

The town is located on the banks of the river Kaveri and connected by road and rail.

Demographics
According to the India population census 2011, Unjalur Town Panchayat has population of 2,482 with 1,235 males and 1,247 females. Literacy rate of Unjalur city is 80.77% higher than state average of 80.09%. Female Sex Ratio is of 1010 against state average of 996. In Unjalur, Male literacy is around 90.37% while female literacy rate is 71.54%.

Economy
Agriculture is the mainstay with rice, sugarcane and turmeric being the major crops cultivated in the region.

Places of interest
Kaveri river banks

Unjalur is known for its proximity to the river Kaveri. Two river-banks provide picture-perfect settings for visitors. A canal for irrigation runs in parallel to the river Kaveri near Unjalur.

Schools 
 Government Higher Secondary School, Unjalur
 Priyadharshini Nursery and Primary School, Unjalur

Temples
Nagaeswara swamy temple

The Temple was constructed nearly 500 years ago by Pandiya kings dedicated to god Shiva. This temple is under the control of Tamil Nadu Hindu Religious and Charitable Endowments department.

Sellandi amman Kovil

Located near bank of river Kaveri.

Adhishtanam of Sri Seshadri Swamgal

A Sookshma-Samadhi of Sri Seshadri Swamigal of Tiruvannamalai also known as an 'Adishtanam' is located in Unjalur, pujas and abhishekams are performed on a daily basis. The Aradhanai of Sri Seshadri Swamigal is conducted here once a year, on a grand scale that lasts for a week in the Tamil month of Margazhi (Dec-Jan) by the Seshadri Swamigal Association, Coimbatore.

Raghavendra Matham

Place of worship dedicated to Sri Raghavendra Swami is located in agraharam of Unjalur also known as Brindhavanam. The Brindhavanam has sannidhi's  dedicated to god Shiva, Vishnu and Kartikeya. The Temple has a gigantic fig tree at its entrance.

Mariamman Temple

Temple dedicated to Mariamman, the 'Grama-Devatha' is the other temple located in the vicinity of the agraharam. A large statue of the presiding-deity Ellai Mariamman is located adjacent to the temple.

Transport

Unjalur is located on the Erode - Tiruchirappalli railway line. The Chennai Egmore - Mangaluru Central express halts at Unjalur regularly. Other passenger and fast-passenger trains stop at this station.

Unjalur can be reached by road. It is 32 km from Erode and 6 km from Kodumudi on SH-84. One can also detour at Velayudhampalayam on the Salem-Karur stretch of NH-7 and travel till the Noyyal-intersection on SH-84 to reach Unjalur.

Nearest airports are at Tiruchirappalli(112 km) and Coimbatore(132 km).

References

Villages in Erode district